In mathematics, a complex torus is a particular kind of complex manifold M whose underlying smooth manifold is a torus in the usual sense (i.e. the cartesian product of some number N circles). Here N must be the even number 2n, where n is the complex dimension of M.

All such complex structures can be obtained as follows: take a lattice Λ in a vector space V isomorphic to Cn considered as real vector space; then the quotient group

is a compact complex manifold. All complex tori, up to isomorphism, are obtained in this way. For n = 1 this is the classical period lattice construction of elliptic curves. For n > 1 Bernhard Riemann found necessary and sufficient conditions for a complex torus to be an algebraic variety; those that are varieties can be embedded into complex projective space, and are the abelian varieties.

The actual projective embeddings are complicated (see equations defining abelian varieties) when n > 1, and are really coextensive with the theory of theta-functions of several complex variables (with fixed modulus). There is nothing as simple as the cubic curve description for n = 1. Computer algebra can handle cases for small n reasonably well. By Chow's theorem, no complex torus other than the abelian varieties can 'fit' into projective space.

Definition 
One way to define complex tori is as a compact connected complex Lie group . These are Lie groups where the structure maps are holomorphic maps of complex manifolds. It turns out that all such compact connected Lie groups are commutative, and are isomorphic to a quotient of their Lie algebra  whose covering map is the exponential map of a Lie algebra to its associated Lie group.

Conversely, given a complex vector space  and a lattice  of maximal rank, the quotient complex manifold  has a complex Lie group structure, and is also compact and connected. This implies the two definitions for complex tori are equivalent.

Period matrix of a complex torus 
That is, we write

so

We can then write the torus  as

is nonsingular.

Example 
For a two-dimensional complex torus, it has a period matrix of the form

for example, the matrix

forms a period matrix since the associated period matrix has determinant 4.

Normalized period matrix 
For any complex torus  of dimension  it has a period matrix  of the form
where  is the identity matrix and  where . We can get this from taking a change of basis of the vector space  giving a block matrix of the form above. The condition for  follows from looking at the corresponding -matrix

since this must be a non-singular matrix. This is because if we calculate the determinant of the block matrix, this is simply

which gives the implication.

Example 
For example, we can write a normalized period matrix for a 2-dimensional complex torus as

one such example is the normalized period matrix

Period matrices of Abelian varieties 
To get a period matrix which gives a projective complex manifold, hence an algebraic variety, the period matrix needs to further satisfy the Riemann bilinear relations.

Homomorphisms of complex tori 

such that the group structure is preserved. This has a number of consequences, such as every homomorphism induces a map of their covering spaces

which is compatible with their covering maps. Furthermore, because  induces a group homomorphism, it must restrict to a morphism of the lattices
In particular, there are injections
 and 
which are called the analytic and rational representations of the space of homomorphisms. These are useful to determining some information about the endomorphism ring  which has rational dimension .

Holomorphic maps of complex tori 
The class of homomorphic maps between complex tori have a very simple structure. Of course, every homomorphism induces a holomorphic map, but every holomorphic map is the composition of a special kind of holomorphic map with a homomorphism. For an element  we define the translation map
 sending  Then, if  is a holomorphic map between complex tori , there is a unique homomorphism  such that

showing the holomorphic maps are not much larger than the set of homomorphisms of complex tori.

Isogenies 
One distinct class of homomorphisms of complex tori are called isogenies. These are endomorphisms of complex tori with a non-zero kernel. For example, if we let  be an integer, then there is an associated map
 sending  which has kernel

Isomorphic complex tori 
There is an isomorphism of complex structures on the real vector space  and the set

Note that as a real manifold, this has dimension

this is important when considering the dimensions of moduli of Abelian varieties, which shows there are far more complex tori than Abelian varieties.

Line bundles and automorphic forms 
Fortunately for complex tori, every complex line bundle  becomes trivial since .

Factors of automorphy 
Starting from the first group cohomology group
we recall how its elements can be represented. Since  acts on  there is an induced action on all of its sheaves, hence on
The -action can then be represented as a holomorphic map . This map satisfies the cocycle condition if

The abelian group of 1-cocycles  is called the group of factors of automorphy. Note that such functions  are also just called factors.

On complex tori 
For complex tori, these functions  are given by functions

which follow the cocycle condition. These are automorphic functions, more precisely, the automorphic functions used in the transformation laws for theta functions. Also, any such map can be written as

for

which is useful for computing invariants related to the associated line bundle.

Line bundles from factors of automorphy 

for the factor . Since this action is free and properly discontinuous, the quotient bundle

is a complex manifold. Furthermore, the projection  induced from the covering projection . This gives a map

which induces an isomorphism

giving the desired result.

For complex tori 
In the case of complex tori, we have  hence there is an isomorphism

representing line bundles on complex tori as 1-cocyles in the associated group cohomology. It is typical to write down the group  as the lattice  defining , hence

First chern class of line bundles on complex tori 
From the exponential exact sequence
the connecting morphism

is the first Chern class map, sending an isomorphism class of a line bundle to its associated first Chern class. If  has factor of automorphy  then the alternating form can be expressed as

Example 
For a normalized period matrix

expanded using the standard basis of  we have the column vectors defining the lattice .

where a number of compatibility conditions must be satisfied.

Sections of line bundles and theta functions 

with  open. Then, evaluated on global sections, this is the set of holomorphic functions  such that

which are exactly the theta functions on the plane. Conversely, this process can be done backwards where the automorphic factor in the theta function is in fact the factor of automorphy defining a line bundle on a complex torus.

Hermitian forms and the Appell-Humbert theorem 

For the alternating -valued 2-form  associated to the line bundle , it can be extended to be -valued. Then, it turns out any -valued alternating form  satisfying the following conditions

 
  for any 

is the extension of some first Chern class  of a line bundle . Moreover, there is an associated Hermitian form  satisfying

 
 

for any .

Neron-Severi group 

Equivalently, it is the image of the homomorphism

from the first Chern class. We can also identify it with the group of alternating real-valued alternating forms  on  such that .

Example of a Hermitian form on an elliptic curve 
For an elliptic curve  given by the lattice  where  we can find the integral form  by looking at a generic alternating matrix and finding the correct compatibility conditions for it to behave as expected. If we use the standard basis  of 
as a real vector space (so ), then we can write out an alternating matrix

These are

Then, taking the inner products (with the standard inner product) of these vectors with the vectors  we get

so if , then

We can then directly verify , which holds for the matrix above. Then, there is an associated Hermitian form

given by

where

Semi-character pairs for Hermitian forms 
For a Hermitian form  a semi-character is a map

such that

hence the map  behaves like a character twisted by the Hermitian form.
<blockquote>
whose elements can be factored as maps

showing a character is of the form

for some fixed dual lattice vector . This gives the isomorphism

of the set of characters with a real torus. The set of all pairs of semi-characters and their associated Hermitian form , or semi-character pairs, forms a group  where

This group structure comes from applying the previous commutation law for semi-characters to the new semicharacter :

It turns out this group surjects onto  and has kernel , giving a short exact sequence

This surjection can be constructed through associating to every semi-character pair a line bundle .

Semi-character pairs and line bundles 
defined as

The cocycle relation

can be easily verified by direct computation. Hence the cocycle determines a line bundle

Note this action can be used to show the sections of the line bundle  are given by the theta functions with factor of automorphy .

Moreover, this is a group homomorphism with a trivial kernel. These facts can all be summarized in the following commutative diagram

where the vertical arrows are isomorphisms, or equality. This diagram is typically called the Appell-Humbert theorem.

Dual complex torus 

As mentioned before, a character on the lattice can be expressed as a function

for some fixed dual vector . If we want to put a complex structure on the real torus of all characters, we need to start with a complex vector space which  embeds into. It turns out that the complex vector space

of complex antilinear maps, is isomorphic to the real dual vector space , which is part of the factorization for writing down characters. Furthermore, there is an associated lattice

Then, we can form the dual complex torus

which has the special property that that dual of the dual complex torus is the original complex torus. Moreover, from the discussion above, we can identify the dual complex torus with the Picard group of 

by sending an anti-linear dual vector  to

giving the map

which factors through the dual complex torus. There are other constructions of the dual complex torus using techniques from the theory of Abelian varietiespg 123-125. Essentially, taking a line bundle  over a complex torus (or Abelian variety) , there is a closed subset  of  defined as the points of  where their translations are invariant, i.e.

Then, the dual complex torus can be constructed as

presenting it as an isogeny.

Poincare bundle 
We can encode this behavior with the following two properties

  for any point  giving the line bundle 
  is a trivial line bundle

where the first is the property discussed above, and the second acts as a normalization property. We can construct  using the following hermitian form

and the semi-character

See also
Poincare bundle
Complex Lie group
Automorphic function
Intermediate Jacobian
Elliptic gamma function

References

Complex 2-dimensional tori 
  - Gives tools to find complex tori which are not Abelian varieties

Gerbes on complex tori 

 - includes examples of gerbes on complex tori

 - could be extended to complex tori

P-adic tori 

 p-adic Abelian Integrals: from Theory to Practice

Complex manifolds
Complex surfaces
Abelian varieties